Ponder the Mystery is the fifth studio album by William Shatner. It was released on October 8, 2013 in the US by Cleopatra Records. The album was produced by Billy Sherwood, who also composed the music and performs vocals, drums, bass, guitars and keys, while many noted musicians also guest, including Tony Kaye.

Track listing
 "Red Shift"
 "Where It's Gone... I Don't Know", with Mick Jones
 "Manhunt", with Simon House
 "Ponder the Mystery", with Steve Vai
 "So Am I", with Al Di Meola
 "Change", with Rick Wakeman
 "Sunset", with Joel Vandroogenbroeck
 "Twilight", with Edgar Winter
 "Rhythm of the Night", with Nik Turner
 "Imagine Things", with Vince Gill
 "Do You See?", with Edgar Froese
 "Deep Down", with Robby Krieger
 "I'm Alright, I Think", with Dave Koz
 "Where Does Time Go?", with George Duke
 "Alive", with Zoot Horn Rollo

References

William Shatner albums
2013 albums
Cleopatra Records albums